Holothuria floridana, the Florida sea cucumber, is a species of marine invertebrate in the family Holothuriidae. It is found on the seabed just below the low tide mark in Florida, the Gulf of Mexico, the Bahamas and the Caribbean.

Description
It has an elongated cylindrical shape with a tough, leathery skin with blunt conical protuberances. On the underside it has several rows of short tube feet. On one end is the mouth surrounded by a ring of feeding tentacles. The body colour is mottled brown, fawn and white.

Distribution and habitat

Biology
It moves across the sandy seabed sifting through the sand with its tentacles and feeding on detritus and other organic particles.

References

Holothuriidae
Animals described in 1851
Taxa named by Louis François de Pourtalès